Events in the year 1978 in Cyprus.

Incumbents 

 President: Spyros Kyprianou
 President of the Parliament: Alekos Michaelides

Events 
Ongoing – Cyprus dispute

 16 June – U.N. Security Council Resolution 430 was adopted and noted that, due to the existing circumstances, the presence of the United Nations Peacekeeping Force in Cyprus would continue to be essential for a peaceful settlement.

Deaths

References 

 
1970s in Cyprus
Years of the 21st century in Cyprus
Cyprus
Cyprus
Cyprus